Cancuén is an archaeological site of the pre-Columbian Maya civilization, located in the Pasión subregion of the central Maya lowlands in the present-day Guatemalan Department of Petén. The city is notable for having one of the largest palaces in the Maya world.

Ancient Cancuén 
Cancuén was a major city during the Classic Period, reaching its peak during the 7th century. The city was a major trade center, specializing in jade, pyrite and obsidian. Its strategic position on the river Pasion helped it dominate trade in the region. Tajal Chan Ahk, one of the city's most powerful rulers, built the city's palace in 770 A.D. The palace covered nearly 23,000 square meters and contained 200 rooms, making it the largest in the Maya area. The city had two ball courts, a large marketplace and a dock on La Pasión River. The city does not contain many large temples or burial sites; it is thought that the inhabitants of Cancuén worshipped and buried their dead in the mountains near the city.

Massacre around 800 A.D.
Several dozen bodies dressed in royal garments were discovered near the base of the central pyramid.  Investigations have shown that the bodies, including the city's ruler at the time, Kan Maax, had been executed and dumped in a cistern. The massacre occurred around 800 A.D., the time when the Mayan civilization collapsed, leading some scholars to believe that it was connected to the upheaval that accompanied the collapse of the Maya civilization.

Abandonment of Cancuén 

Cancuén is thought to have been abandoned shortly after the massacre event around 800 A.D., and was subsequently not re-occupied.

Excavation 
The site was rediscovered in 1905 by Austrian explorer Teoberto Maler. No major temples or burial sites were reported in the initial investigations, leading archaeologists to believe it had been a minor or subsidiary site. Cancuén was largely ignored until 1967, when students from Harvard University uncovered the ruins of the largest Palace in the Maya world. Further investigations showed that the size of the structure and the entire site had previously been underestimated; it is now thought that a "maze of hundreds of rooms with 20-foot-high, arched ceilings" covered at least . Subsequent archaeological expeditions were launched following the discovery of the palace, including teams from Vanderbilt University and the Universidad del Valle de Guatemala. The National Geographic Society is also connected to the excavations.

Known persons

See also
Last Days of the Maya

Notes

References

External links 
Visit Cancuen
Maya Palace Uncovered
USATODAY: A ‘strange and fascinating’ find
National Geographic: Archaeologist Uncover Maya “Masterpiece” in Guatemala
Photo Gallery and Site description

770s establishments
800 disestablishments
8th-century establishments in Guatemala
8th-century disestablishments in the Maya civilization
Populated places disestablished in the 8th century
1905 archaeological discoveries
Maya sites in Petén Department
Archaeological sites in Guatemala
Former populated places in Guatemala
Classic period in Mesoamerica